Julie Terese Sweet (née Spellman, born 1966/1967) is an American business executive and attorney. She is chair and chief executive officer (CEO) of Accenture, a multinational professional services company. 

The New York Times and Fortune have named her among the most powerful women in corporate America.

Early life and education 
Sweet grew up in Tustin, California, and was a speech and debate star at Tustin High School. She holds a bachelor's degree from Claremont McKenna College and a J.D. degree from Columbia Law School.

Career 
Prior to Sweet's work at Accenture, she was an attorney at law firm Cravath, Swaine & Moore. She worked at the firm for 17 years and was partner for 10. Sweet was the ninth woman ever to make partner at the firm. She worked on financing, mergers and acquisitions, and general corporate counsel.

Accenture recruited Sweet as general counsel in 2010. In 2015, she became CEO of Accenture's North America business, the company's largest market. Since early in her career at Accenture, she served on the company's global management committee. Alongside then-CEO Pierre Nanterme, Sweet developed Accenture's mergers and acquisitions strategy.

Accenture named Sweet its CEO effective September 2019, the first woman to hold that position. She replaced interim CEO David Rowland. At the time of her appointment, she was one of 27 women leading companies in the S&P 500 and the 15th female CEO of all Fortune Global 500 companies. In September 2021, Sweet became chair of Accenture.

Sweet has advocated for diversity, inclusion, and workplace gender parity. Sweet supports Accenture's goal to have a staff equally represented by men and women by 2025; as of 2019, 42 percent of Accenture's staff was female. Sweet was named a top CEO for diversity by the website Comparably in 2019. Sweet has called for addressing the skills gap in the U.S. and supported the national apprenticeship movement. She participated in The New York Timess New Rules Summit.

In addition to her work at Accenture, Sweet served on the boards for Catalyst, the World Economic Forum, the Business Roundtable, where she chairs the Technology Committee, the Center for Strategic & International Studies, and the Marriott Foundation for People with Disabilities – Bridges from School to Work, as of 2022.

The New York Times called Sweet "one of the most powerful women in corporate America" in 2019. Fortune magazine included Julie Sweet in the their top 10 “Most Powerful Women” list since 2016 and she was named No. 1 on the list for 2020. Fortune noted Julie “steered Accenture’s more than half a million employees in 51 countries through the pandemic, a crisis that has made the company’s skills more essential than ever.” Julie Sweet has subsequently been ranked by Fortune magazine as No. 3 on the list for 2021 and No. 2 on the list for 2022.

Personal life
Sweet is married to Chad Creighton Sweet, who was Republican Ted Cruz's campaign chairman for Cruz's 2016 presidential campaign. She has two daughters. They live in Bethesda, Maryland.

References

External links 
 Accenture website page

Accenture people
Claremont McKenna College alumni
American chief executives of Fortune 500 companies
1960s births
Living people
People from Tustin, California
People from Bethesda, Maryland
Cravath, Swaine & Moore partners